Spathoglottis affinis is a species of orchid found from Indochina to western Malesia.

affinis